The Skip Barber Racing School is an American racing and driving school. Skip Barber founded the school in 1975.

History
In 1975, Skip Barber started the Skip Barber School of High Performance Driving at Riverside International Raceway. In 1976, it was renamed the Skip Barber Racing School. Despite selling the school in 1999, Barber remains active in motorsports today as the owner of Lime Rock Park.

On May 22, 2017, the school filed for Chapter 11 bankruptcy.

On December 19, 2017, the school was acquired by DeMonte Motorsports.

See also
Barber Pro Series
Skip Barber Racing (video game)

References

External links
 Skip Barber Racing Official Website

Racing schools
1975 establishments in the United States